Daniel Calvo Flores was a Santiago Court of Appeals judge of the Republic of Chile. At the moment he is a 4º judicial attorney in the Santiago Court of Appeals.

The privately owned TV station Chilevisión aired a broadcast of film taken with a hidden camera of Calvo stating that he frequented a gay sauna.
Judge Daniel Calvo was frame-up by the Chilean Navy Intelligence agency in retaliation for the human rights investigations the judge was doing against retired admiral Carlos Mauricio Blanlot Kerbernhard. This officer was responsible for the death of 4 Chilean political prisoners from the city of Tome, Chile under the Pinochet dictatorship. The victims (Ricardo Barra Martínez, Miguel Catalán Febrero, Héctor Lepe Moraga y Tránsito Cabrera Ortiz) were detained September 27, 1973 and killed by a group of officer under the command of Carlos Mauricio Blanlot Kerbernhard.

References 

Year of birth missing (living people)
Living people
21st-century Chilean judges
Chilean gay men
LGBT judges
21st-century Chilean LGBT people